Shushanik (Shushanika, Vardandukht) [, ; c. 440 – 475] was a Christian Armenian woman who was tortured to death by her husband Varsken in the town of Tsurtavi, Georgia. Since she died defending her right to profess Christianity, she is regarded as a martyr. Her martyrdom is described in her confessor Jacob’s hagiographic work, the oldest extant work of Georgian language literature. The hagiography details Shushanik's extensive resistance to imprisonment, isolation, torture and cruelty.

Shushanik was a daughter of the Armenian military commander Vardan Mamikonian and married  the Mihranid ruler (pitiakhsh) Varsken, son of Arshusha II. Varsken was a defiant vassal of Vakhtang I Gorgasali, King of Kartli (Iberia), and took a pro-Persian position, renouncing Christianity and adopting Zoroastrianism. He killed his spouse after she refused to submit to his order to abandon her Christian faith. Varsken himself was put to death by King Vakhtang in 482.

Shushanik
has been canonized by the Georgian Orthodox Church and is venerated by the Armenian Apostolic Church. Her feast day is celebrated on October 17 in Georgia and Tuesday between September 20–26 in Armenia.

References

External links 
Martyrdom of Shushanik

440s births
475 deaths
Saints of the Armenian Apostolic Church
Saints of Georgia (country)
Late Ancient Christian female saints
5th-century Christian saints
5th-century Christian martyrs
Mamikonian family
5th-century women
Christians in the Sasanian Empire
People executed by the Sasanian Empire
Women from the Sasanian Empire
Armenian people from the Sasanian Empire